Jackson Township is a township in Geary County, Kansas, USA.  As of the 2000 census, its population was 78.

History
Jackson Township was organized in 1872. It was named for President Andrew Jackson.

Geography
According to the USGS, it contains one cemetery, Briggs.

The streams of Briggs Branch, Deadman Creek, Horne Branch and Poole Branch run through this township.

References

 USGS Geographic Names Information System (GNIS)

Further reading

External links
 City-Data.com

Townships in Geary County, Kansas
Townships in Kansas